North Polar Basin may refer to:
 North Polar Basin (Mars)
 Arctic Basin, abyssal features within the Arctic Ocean